The 1996 Missouri Valley Conference men's soccer season was the 6th season of men's varsity soccer in the conference.

The 1996 Missouri Valley Conference Men's Soccer Tournament was hosted by Creighton and won by Evansville.

Teams

MVC Tournament

See also 

 Missouri Valley Conference
 Missouri Valley Conference men's soccer tournament
 1996 NCAA Division I men's soccer season
 1996 in American soccer

References 

Missouri Valley Conference
1996 NCAA Division I men's soccer season